This is an alphabetical list of country music performers. It includes artists who played country music at some point in their career, even if they were not exclusively country music performers.



0-9

A

B

C

D

E

F

G

H

I

J

K

L

M

N

O

P

Q

R

S

T

U

V

W

Y

Z

References

 
 
 
Country